Giovanni Francesco Mormando (Mormanno 1449 - Naples 1530) was an Italian architect active in Naples, Italy.

He helped designing the church of Santi Severino e Sossio. He also worked on the Chiesetta della Stella (Santa Maria della Stella alle Paparelle), and the  Palazzo Filomarini for the Principe della Rocca. He is said to have met with and worked in the style of Leon Battista Alberti. The architect Sigismondo di Giovanni, who designed the Seggio di Nido and the cupola for the church of Santi Severino e Sossio, was his pupil.  He traveled to Spain, to work for Ferdinand of Aragon, where he died. He putatively designed his home in Naples, Palazzo Mormando, located on via San Gregorio Armeno.

Sources

1455 births
1552 deaths
15th-century Italian architects
16th-century Italian architects
Architects from Naples